Cerro Punta may refer to:

Cerro Punta, Chiriquí, city in Panama
Cerro de Punta, highest peak of Puerto Rico